Thirty Miles West is the seventeenth  studio album by American country music artist Alan Jackson. It was released on June 5, 2012, and is Jackson's first album on his own Alan's Country Records in a joint venture with EMI Nashville. The album includes the singles "Long Way to Go," "So You Don't Have to Love Me Anymore" and "You Go Your Way."

The album's title refers to a song about a stretch of the Dixie Highway near Jackson's hometown of Newnan, Georgia. The song, "Dixie Highway," is a duet with Zac Brown.

Critical reception

Upon its release, Thirty Miles West received generally positive reviews from most music critics. At Metacritic, which assigns a normalized rating out of 100 to reviews from mainstream critics, the album received an average score of 75, based on 4 reviews, which indicates "generally favorable reviews".

Track listing

Personnel
 Zac Brown - duet vocals on "Dixie Highway"
 J.T. Corenflos - electric guitar
 Dan Dugmore - steel guitar, slide guitar
 Larry Franklin - fiddle, mandolin
 Greenwood Hart - percussion
 Alan Jackson - lead vocals
 John Barlow Jarvis - piano, Wurlitzer
 Andy Leftwich - fiddle
 Brent Mason - electric guitar, gut string guitar
 Greg Morrow - drums
 Gordon Mote - Hammond B-3 organ, piano, Wurlitzer 
 Steve Patrick - trumpet
 John Wesley Ryles - background vocals
 Marty Slayton - background vocals
 Bobby Terry - acoustic guitar, gut string guitar
 Scott Vestal - banjo
 Glenn Worf - bass guitar

Charts

Weekly charts

Year-end charts

References

2012 albums
Alan Jackson albums
EMI Records albums
Albums produced by Keith Stegall